Prelude to Bruise is a 2014 poetry collection by American author Saeed Jones, published by Coffee House Press on September 9, 2014.

Contents

Reception
Publishers Weekly praised the collection, writing, "Solid from start to finish, possessing amazing energy and focus, a bold new voice in poetry has announced itself."

Writing for NPR, poet Amal El-Mohtar said, "There are too many exceptional poems here to single out, and not a single one that didn't at least impress me."

Awards and nominations
It won the 2015 Stonewall Book Award-Barbara Gittings Literature Award and the 2015 PEN/Joyce Osterweil Award for Poetry. It was a finalist for the 2015 Thom Gunn Award for Gay Poetry, the 2014 Lambda Literary Award for Gay Poetry, and the 2014 National Book Critics Circle Award for Poetry.

References

2014 poetry books
American poetry collections
Coffee House Press books
Stonewall Book Award-winning works
LGBT poetry